The Bard's Tale Construction Set is a computer game creation system that allows for the creation of dungeon crawl video games based on the Bard's Tale game engine. It was developed by Interplay Productions in 1991 and distributed by Electronic Arts. It was released for the Amiga and MS-DOS.

Unlike other similar engines, it was not required to own The Bard's Tale Construction Set in order to play games which were created with it, while also allowing designers to add in their own custom title screen. This made it possible for anyone to share and distribute their own constructed games using the system, and a number of freeware and shareware titles were developed using the system and released.

Sample scenario
Included with the software was a sample scenario for the purpose of playing and learning from, entitled Star Light Festival.

Set in the small rundown village of Isil Thania, a band of adventurers has traveled from afar to witness the annual Star Light Festival in which an eerie light comes down from a star for one night only making the night into day.

While awaiting the Festival at the Rainbow Bar, a small twisted man leads the characters into the sewers (which feature the same maps found in the original Bard's Tale game), and from there the characters engages upon a quest that takes them from one location in the city to the next, eventually to find the secret truths behind the Star Cult and the town of Isil Thania.

Created games
Various companies created commercial games created using the program. The Bard's Quest was a three-part game series created by Alex Ghadaksaz of VisionSoft (PC, 1994) Flying Buffalo Inc. offered a game called The Buftale based on the company's offices and employees.

Reception
Computer Gaming Worlds Scorpia criticized the small number of graphics and damage spells, but still recommended the program to those interested in designing their own computer role-playing games. The game was reviewed in 1992 in Dragon #183 by Hartley, Patricia, and Kirk Lesser in "The Role of Computers" column. The reviewers gave the game 5 out of 5 stars.

Reviews
Amiga World (Jul, 1993)
Amiga Joker (Feb, 1993)
Amiga Action (Mar, 1993)
CU Amiga (Mar, 1993)
Amiga Format (Apr, 1993)
Amiga Power (Mar, 1993)
Amiga Magazine (Jul, 1993)

Developers
Feargus Urquhart served as a play tester for The Bard's Tale Construction Set, and went on to found the game companies Black Isle Studios and Obsidian Entertainment.

References

External links

The Bard's Tale Compendium
Bt Builder - an attempt to create an open source implementation of The Bard's Tale Construction Set.

1991 video games
Amiga games
DOS games
Electronic Arts games
First-person party-based dungeon crawler video games
Role-playing video games
Video game development software
Video games scored by Charles Deenen